In mathematical logic, Beth definability is a result that connects implicit definability of a property to its explicit definability. Specifically Beth definability states that the two senses of definability are equivalent.

First-order logic has the Beth definability property.

Statement

For first-order logic, the theorem states that, given a theory T in the language L' ⊇ L and a formula φ in L', then the following are equivalent:
 for any two models A and B of T such that A|L = B|L (where A|L is the reduct of A to L), it is the case that A ⊨ φ[a] if and only if B ⊨ φ[a] (for all tuples a of A)
 φ is equivalent modulo T to a formula ψ in L.
Less formally: a property is implicitly definable in a theory in language L (via a formula φ of an extended language L') only if that property is explicitly definable in that theory (by formula ψ in the original language L).

Clearly the converse holds as well, so that we have an equivalence between implicit and explicit definability. That is, a "property" is explicitly definable with respect to a theory if and only if it is implicitly definable.

The theorem does not hold if the condition is restricted to finite models. We may have A ⊨ φ[a] if and only if B ⊨ φ[a] for all pairs A,B of finite models without there being any L-formula ψ equivalent to φ  modulo T.

The result was first proven by Evert Willem Beth.

See also

Sources

 Wilfrid Hodges A Shorter Model Theory. Cambridge University Press, 1997.

Mathematical logic
Mathematical structures
Model theory
Theorems in the foundations of mathematics